Where Are You? is the thirteenth studio album by Frank Sinatra.

This is the first album Sinatra recorded at Capitol without Nelson Riddle, as well as the first he recorded in stereo. In 1970 it was re-issued as a ten track album under the name The Night We Called It a Day.

Track listing
"Where Are You?" (Harold Adamson, Jimmy McHugh) – 3:30
"The Night We Called It a Day" (Matt Dennis, Tom Adair) – 3:28
"I Cover the Waterfront" (Johnny Green, Edward Heyman) – 2:58
"Maybe You'll Be There" (Rube Bloom, Sammy Gallop) – 3:07
"Laura" (David Raksin, Johnny Mercer) – 3:28
"Lonely Town" (Leonard Bernstein, Betty Comden, Adolph Green) – 4:12
"Autumn Leaves" (Jacques Prévert, Mercer, Joseph Kosma) – 2:52
"I'm a Fool to Want You" (Frank Sinatra, Jack Wolf, Joel Herron) – 4:51
"I Think of You" (Jack Elliott, Don Marcotte) – 3:04
"Where Is the One?" (Alec Wilder, Edwin Finckel) – 3:13
"There's No You" (Tom Adair, Hal Hopper) – 3:48
"Baby Won't You Please Come Home" (Charles Warfield, Clarence Williams) – 3:00
 CD reissue bonus tracks not included on the original 1957 release:
"I Can Read Between the Lines" (Sid Frank, Ray Getzov) – 2:43
"It Worries Me" (Fritz Schultz-Reichelt, Carl Sigman) – 2:53
"Rain (Falling from the Skies)" (Robert Mellin, Gunther Finlay) – 3:25
"Don't Worry 'Bout Me" (Rube Bloom, Ted Koehler) – 3:08

The song "I Think of You" is based on lyrical second theme in E flat major from The Piano Concerto No. 2 in C minor, Op. 18, I. Moderato by Sergei Rachmaninoff.

Early pressings of the original stereo album had only 11 tracks while the mono version had all 12 tracks. The stereo edition may have been missing "I Cover The Waterfront" because it was only recorded in mono. Later stereo pressings in some international markets and in boxed sets restored "Waterfront," beginning circa 1975 (in Holland).

Personnel
 Frank Sinatra – vocals
 Gordon Jenkins –arranger, conductor
 Nelson Riddle - arranger, conductor (tracks 13-16, unrelated CD bonus tracks only)

Recording dates
April 10, 1957 – "The Night We Called It a Day", "Autumn Leaves", "Where Is the One?", "There's No You"
April 29, 1957 – "I Cover the Waterfront", "Laura", "Lonely Town", "Baby Won't You Please Come Home"
May 1, 1957 – "Where Are You?", "Maybe You'll Be There", "I'm a Fool to Want You", "I Think of You"

Bonus tracks 
April 30, 1953 – "Don't Worry 'Bout Me"
May 2, 1953 – "I Can Read Between the Lines"
December 9, 1953 – "Rain (Falling from the Skies)"
May 13, 1954 – "It Worries Me"

References

Frank Sinatra albums
Capitol Records albums
1957 albums
Albums arranged by Gordon Jenkins
Albums conducted by Gordon Jenkins
Albums recorded at Capitol Studios